The International Lawyer is a quarterly peer-reviewed law journal  and the official publication of the American Bar Association's (ABA) Section of International Law and Practice. It was established in 1966 and has been based at Southern Methodist University since 1986. The journal focuses primarily on practical issues of international law, including international trade, licensing, direct investment, finance, taxation, litigation, and dispute resolution.

External links
 

American Bar Association
International law journals
Southern Methodist University
American law journals